Paramount Airways Limited was a 1980s British inclusive-tour charter airline based at Bristol Airport. It operated flights from Bristol, Belfast and Birmingham to Mediterranean destinations. The airline entered receivership in November 1989.

History
Paramount ordered two new McDonnell Douglas MD-83 airliners, the first was delivered on 24 April 1987 to allow operations to start on 1 May 1987. During the European winter the airline operated charter flights from Gatwick Airport to Goa. The airline acquired two more MD-83s for the 1988 charter season.

In 1989 the company entered administration with debts of £11 million, it was also under examination by the Serious Fraud Office over the loss of £13.5 million by the Eagle Trust which it had close links and shared a chairman.

The company also operated Cessna Citation executive jets as Paramount Executive.

Fleet
4 x McDonnell Douglas MD-83

See also
 List of defunct airlines of the United Kingdom

References

Defunct airlines of the United Kingdom
Airlines established in 1986
Airlines disestablished in 1989